Stockdale Harrison (1846-10 November 1914) FRIBA was an architect based in Leicester best known for Usher Hall, Edinburgh.

History
Stockdale Harrison was born in November 1846, the son of William Harrison (1813-1873) timber merchant, and Mary Everard (1820-1869). He was christened on 2 December 1846 in St George's Church, Leicester.

In 1863 Stockdale Harrison was articled to James Bird of Leicester. In 1868 he moved to become an assistant to George Somers Leigh Clarke of London. On 1 October 1869 he was made a Freeman and Apprentice of Leicester and he set up in private practice, initially in Hotel street and then at 7 St Martins. In 1882 he became an Associate of the RIBA; in 1890 he became FRIBA. Between 1890 and 1892 he was President of the Leicestershire and Rutland Society of Architects

He designed churches in the gothic revival style, and was also responsible for domestic architecture in the vernacular revival style mainly in Leicester, but also in other areas of the East Midlands.

He married artist Marianne Bailey (1847-1923), daughter of James Bailey and Mary Ann nee Musk, on 4 September 1872 at St Paul's Church, Leicester, and their children were:
James Stockdale Harrison (1874-1952) 
Shirley Harrison (1875-1961)
Marianne Harrison (1878-1971)
Florence Harrison (b. 1878)
(Captain) Everard Harrison (1880-1917)
Gregory Harrison (1883-1889)
Priscilla Harrison (1885-1975)
Margaret Harrison (1891)

Stockdale Harrison was joined in business by his sons James (1892) and Shirley (1904), and from 1904 the business operated under the name Stockdale Harrison and Sons.

Stockdale Harrison died on 10 November 1914 leaving an estate valued at £22,529 7s 10d and the business continued under the management of his sons James and Shirley.

Works

References

1846 births
1914 deaths
19th-century English architects
20th-century English architects
Architects from Leicester
Fellows of the Royal Institute of British Architects